Aedes (Verrallina) yerburyi is a species complex of zoophilic mosquito belonging to the genus Aedes. It is endemic to Sri Lanka

References

External links
Description of the egg of Aedes (Levua) suvae Stone and Bohart (Diptera: Culicidae).
MOSQUITO STUDIES IN THE INDIAN SUBREGION

yerburyi
Insects described in 1917